Microsoft Hohm was an online web application by Microsoft that enables consumers to analyze their energy usage and provides energy saving recommendations.

History
Announced on June 24, 2009, Microsoft Hohm was built on the Windows Azure cloud operating system. Microsoft licensed the Home Energy Saver energy simulation program developed at Lawrence Berkeley National Laboratory to drive Microsoft Hohm. It was publicly released on July 6, 2009.

Home Energy Saver and Hohm received an R&D 100 Award in 2010.

Fate of Hohm
The Hohm service was discontinued on May 31, 2012 due to a lack of consumer uptake.

See also
Google PowerMeter
Home energy monitor
OPOWER

References

External links
 
 Official blog
 Official Facebook Page

Hohm
Energy conservation